A nuclear groove is an invagination of the nuclear envelope, in the longitudinal axis. It can be present in:
Thyroid neoplasms: It is a characteristic feature of papillary thyroid carcinoma, but has also been seen in other types of thyroid neoplasms, as well as in non-neoplastic thyroid lesions. 
Ovarian tumors including Brenner tumors, adult granulosa cell tumors, and transitional cell tumors. 
Breast carcinomas 
Vaginal, cervical and/or endometrial neoplasms
Papillary neoplasms of several organs: papillary transitional cell carcinoma of the urinary bladder, papillary renal cell carcinoma, papillary endometrioid carcinoma of the prostate, in thymic carcinomas, and in non-epithelial tumors.

References

Histopathology